The Born Again Tour was a concert tour by in support of Black Sabbath's Born Again album.  Both the album and the tour were the only ones of Black Sabbath's to feature former Deep Purple frontman Ian Gillan on lead vocals.  Ex-Electric Light Orchestra drummer Bev Bevan was hired to replace Bill Ward, who had returned to the band for the recording of the album after a two-year hiatus, for the tour.  This was the final tour to feature original Black Sabbath bassist Geezer Butler until 1992's Dehumanizer tour.

Tour
"There had been conversations during the Born Again sessions about going on tour," Bill Ward recalled, "and I was barely making it through the sessions, let alone touring. The thought of touring put me in such a state of panic, anxiety and dread that I couldn't possibly face the idea… but I was too ashamed to tell everybody. And rather than tell everybody, I drank and I disappeared. I escaped. That's how I used to do things: when I couldn't handle a situation, I would just drink and just run away… I came back to the United States, got hospitalised a couple of times, ended up back on the streets and, in the early part of January 1984, I went into my final detox. And from that point on I haven't taken a drink. And I haven't used any narcotics."

Meanwhile, between 7 and 14 August 1983, the band used the National Exhibition Centre, in Birmingham, England, to rehearse. The first leg of the tour consisted of seven European shows in August, followed by a second European leg in September and October, featuring 16 shows.

"We were on flight 666 to Helsinki," recalled Geezer Butler, "and even the baggage label said 'HEL'. We were all shitting ourselves getting on that plane. I got pissed, of course. I was severely boozing then. I was pissed for that whole tour."

Two North American legs consisted of 36 shows from October through November, then 34 shows from January through March 1984.

There were many cancellations during the North American tour owing to problems with an oversized Stonehenge stage set. This was the reason that initial shows in Canada were cancelled, delaying the first North American leg. The crew also got caught in a November blizzard while crossing the Continental Divide, forcing the cancellation of two shows in Salt Lake City and Reno.

There were more difficulties during the second North American leg which delayed their shows for nearly a week.  One show in Salisbury, Maryland (28 February 1984) was beset by local religious protests that were noted in the local papers, but was ultimately cancelled due to poor ticket sales.  Of the 96 currently confirmed shows, 30% were likely cancelled for one reason or another. The band did manage to sell out at least a dozen shows including Saginaw, Worcester, Rockford, Providence, Cleveland, Detroit, New Haven, Portland, Philadelphia, Toronto, East Rutherford and Chicago.

Tour dates

Set lists 
The set list featured two Dio-era tracks, "Heaven and Hell" and "Neon Knights", as well as a good helping from the new album, and a few fan favorites reappeared in the set, such as "Supernaut" and "Rock 'n' Roll Doctor".  Each show on the tour ended with a two-song encore, with the first song being a cover of the Deep Purple classic "Smoke on the Water", as Ian Gillan was formerly of Deep Purple. This is one of the few cover songs Black Sabbath have ever done at live shows. They played the song on Iommi's suggestion. He felt it was a 'bum deal' that Gillan had to perform so many old Sabbath songs and none of his own.

Songs played on the tour
"Supertzar"   
"Children of the Grave"   
"Hot Line"   
"War Pigs"   
"Born Again"   
"Supernaut"    
"Rock 'n' Roll Doctor" ("Horrible," recalled Iommi. "It was difficult for him [Gillan] to sing certain Sabbath songs.)"
"Stonehenge"   
"Disturbing the Priest"   
"Keep It Warm"   
"Black Sabbath"   
"The Dark"   
"Zero the Hero"  
"Heaven and Hell"   
"Neon Knights"
"Digital Bitch"   
"Iron Man"   
"Smoke on the Water"   
"Paranoid"   
"Children of the Sea" (extract)

Songs rehearsed for the tour, but never played live

"Sabbra Cadabra"
"Evil Woman"
"Never Say Die"
"Symptom of the Universe"
"N.I.B."
"The Wizard"
"Tomorrow's Dream"

Staging
There were many problems surrounding the tour for the album, including having little room on stage owing to it being decorated with Stonehenge replicas. In 2005, Geezer Butler explained:

Ian Gillan maintained that Stonehenge was indeed Geezer's idea – and that, asked for details by set buildings Light and Sound Design, Geezer had simply said: "Life-size." Filling three containers, it was too big for any stage, so only a small part of it was used at a time, but the band and crew still had problems edging between the monoliths.

"We couldn't believe the size of it when we saw it," recalled Iommi. "We seen it when we rehearsed at the NEC [in Birmingham] for a whole and we'd only seen it on the floor; parts of it – they hadn't finished it… It gets to [the 1983] Reading [festival] and we've got these huge ones at the back that are just, like, gigantic."

Photos of the Born Again tour show that at least some of the stones were present on stage.

The tour's early stages featured a dwarf, dressed to look like the demon-infant from the album cover.

The dimension problems and use of dwarfs bear strong similarities to the infamous Stonehenge scene in the movie This Is Spinal Tap, released a year after Sabbath's tour.  "It was great when I saw that film, though," recalled Butler, "because it was at the end of that tour with Gillan… I thought they'd had a spy with us or something – it was so like us."

Personnel
Tony Iommi – guitar
Geezer Butler – bass guitar
Ian Gillan – vocals
Bev Bevan – drums
Geoff Nicholls – keyboards (performed off stage)

Bill Ward was unable to play the Born Again tour because of personal problems. He explains:

Opening acts
Pretty Maids were the support act on the initial Scandinavian dates (18–24 August 1983). The Irish date was part of a one day festival including Mama's Boys, Anvil, Twisted Sister, and Motörhead. Diamond Head provided support on the remaining European dates (13 September to 3 October) together with Lita Ford (27-28 September), but was also supplanted by Girlschool during the Spanish gigs (13–15 September 1983) and Belgian speed metallers Acid in Brussels (1 October).

Streetheart were originally scheduled to be the support act at the beginning of the 1983 Canadian leg, but those initial shows were canceled.  Instead, Scottish rockers Nazareth filled in on the majority of the Canadian shows (from 20 October through 24th) until Quiet Riot were available for the show in Toronto (25 October).  However, Nazareth paired with Quiet Riot in London, Ontario (26 October) and replaced Black Sabbath as the headliner when their Stonehenge set wouldn't fit into the arena!

Quiet Riot appeared with Sabbath for the remainder of the first North American leg and all U.S. dates through 30 November.  Fastway also made an appearance in New Haven on 8 November.

Heaven provided support at the beginning of the 2nd North American leg from 25 January through at least the end of January. Ratt appeared only at the first show in Daly City on 25 January.  Girlschool reappeared for a single show in San Antonio on 4 February.  Night Ranger joined the tour from 7 February through 26.  They were replaced by Canadian band Helix for two shows in New York.  The final show in Springfield, MA was supported by Cryer and Lodestar that featured guitar virtuoso Tony MacAlpine.

References

External links
Gillan the Hero – Fan site with information on the tour.
Black Sabbath Online - Long running fan site with information on tour

1983 concert tours
1984 concert tours
Black Sabbath concert tours